The Alberto Lleras Dam, also known as the Guavio Dam, is a rock-fill embankment dam on the Guavio River near Guavio, Colombia.

The dam is named as for Alberto Lleras Camargo (3 July 1906 – 4 January 1990) who was the 20th President of Colombia (1958–1962).

See also 

 List of conventional hydroelectric power stations
 List of power stations in Colombia

References 

Dams completed in 1989
Energy infrastructure completed in 1992
Dams in Colombia
Hydroelectric power stations in Colombia
Rock-filled dams
Buildings and structures in Cundinamarca Department